Jennifer Mary Tolhurst (born 1951) is the current Lord-Lieutenant of Essex. She has been in the position since 5 August 2017.

Biography
Tolhurst started the Danbury and Little Baddow branch of the NSPCC and chaired the Prince's Youth Business Trust in Essex. She was a magistrate and vice chairman of the governors of New Hall School. She remains vice-president of the Essex Community Foundation, serves on Essex University Court, is an assessor for the Queen's Award for Voluntary Service and is vice-chairman of the Lord Chancellor's Advisory Committee. She was High Sheriff of Essex in 2005.

Tolhurst lives in Danbury with her husband, Philip. They have three grown-up children and seven grandchildren.

She succeeded Lord Petre, 18th Baron of the Petre family, whose ancestral family home is at Ingatestone Hall, who had been the lord-lieutenant of Essex for the previous fifteen years but stood down after turning 75 – the customary age of retirement for the Sovereign's representatives.

References

High Sheriffs of Essex
Lord-Lieutenants of Essex
Living people
1951 births